Bakar is a town in the Primorje-Gorski Kotar County in western Croatia. The population of the town was 8,279 according to the 2011 Croatian census, including 1,473 in the titular settlement. Ninety percent of the population declared themselves Croats by ethnicity. The largest ethnic minority are the Serbs with 2.91% of the population. The old part of Bakar is situated on a hill overlooking the Bay of Bakar.  is the Croatian word for "copper".

Bakar is a port for bulk cargo and used to be known for its industrial complex that included a coke factory, which produced a considerable amount of pollution. Bakar's coke factory was closed in 1995 and the area's pollution has subsided significantly.

Municipality

Demographics

Coat of arms 
Bakar was granted its coat of arms and town privileges in 1799 by Francis II, Holy Roman Emperor. The coat of arms was in the artistic style typical for the period, with a cartouche with large landscapes and ornamentation around the shield within a circular inscription.

The shield of the coat of arms features a red-and-white checkered top or "chief", with three local gray stone castles on green hills in the middle, and a black anchor on orange at the bottom.

Recognizable buildings

 Turkish house: built by an unknown architect, possibly in the 14th century, this peculiar building resembles Ottoman architecture. Following 1965 reconstruction the house served as an artistic atelier.
 Roman house: former monastery, built in the 18th century
 Parish church of St. Andrew the Apostle: originally built in the 12th century and destroyed in 1323 by earthquake. In the Middle Ages its catacombs were used for wealthy people to hide from plague that passed the city. It is the third largest late Baroque church in Croatia.
 Kaštel (Castel): A castle built in the 16th century by the order of Emperor Ferdinand I and used as a protection against the Turks. It has three kitchens, two dungeons, little chapel of St. Michael, and many other rooms.

History

In the late 19th and early 20th century, Bakar was a district capital in the Modruš-Rijeka County of the Kingdom of Croatia-Slavonia.

World War I
In February 1918 during WW I Gabriele D'Annunzio and Costanzo Ciano took part in a daring, if militarily irrelevant, naval raid on the harbour of Bakar (known in Italy as La beffa di Buccari, lit. "The Bakar Mockery"), helping to raise the spirits of the Italian public.

After WWI, from the end of 1920, Bakar was one of the major points of entry of thousands of Russian refugees, arriving in the Kingdom of SHS following the end of the Russian Civil War in the European part of the former Russian Empire, mostly from Crimea, after the final defeat of White armies under general Wrangel there in November 1920.

World War II
During WW II, in Bakar was an Italian concentration camp, where civil population from Province of Ljubljana, as well as Croats and Serbs was interned. It the peak, there was 893 internees.

Trivia
In 1972 director Radley Metzger filmed his movie Score in Bakar, Croatia.

References

External links 

 Bakar official Website
 Bakar Tourist Board

Cities and towns in Croatia
Populated coastal places in Croatia
Populated places in Primorje-Gorski Kotar County
Modruš-Rijeka County